The Federal Ministry of Justice is the legal arm of the Federal Government of Nigeria, primarily concerned with bringing cases before the judiciary that are initiated or assumed by the government. The headquarters of the organisation are located in the Maitama district, Abuja.

Organisation 
It is headed by the Attorney General of the federation who also serves as the Minister of Justice. The Attorney General is appointed by the President, and is assisted by a Permanent Secretary, who is a career civil servant. As of June 2019, the Attorney General is Abubakar Malami.
The Permanent Secretary is Mrs Beatrice Jedy-Agba, OON, mni.

Different departments in the ministry are responsible for:
 Public prosecution,
 Citizens rights,
 Law reporting,
 Finance and administration,
 Planning, research and statistics,
 Legal drafting,
 International and comparative law,
 Civil litigation,
 Solicitors,
 Human resource management and
 Procurement.

List of ministers

 Taslim Elias, CFR, GCON (1960–1966)
 G.I.M Onyiuke, SAN (1 March 1966 – 29 July 1966)
 Nabo Graham-Douglas (1966–1972)
 Dan Onuorah Ibekwe (1972–1975)
 Augustine Nnamani, CON (1975-1979)
 Richard Akinjide, SAN (1979-1983)
 Kehinde Sofola, SAN (October 1983–December 1983)
 Chike Ofodile, SAN (1984–August 1985)
 Bola Ajibola, SAN (12 September 1985–4 December 1991)
 Clement Akpamgbo, SAN (1991–1993)
 Olu Onagoruwa (1993–1994)
 Michael Ashikodi Agbamuche, SAN (1994–1997)
 Achiji Abdullahi Ibrahim, OFR, SAN (1997–May 1999)
 Kanu Godwin Agabi, SAN (June 1999–January 2000)
 Bola Ige, SAN (3 January 2000–23 December 2001)
 Kanu Godwin Agabi, SAN (2002-2003)
 Akin Olujimi, SAN (July 2003–July 2005)
 Bayo Ojo,  SAN, FCI ARB, (UK) (July 2005–July 2007)
 Michael Aondoakaa, SAN (26 July 2007–10 February 2010)
 Adetokunbo Kayode, SAN (10 February 2010–17 March 2010)
 Mohammed Bello Adoke, SAN, CFR  (6 April 2010– 29 May 2011)
 Mohammed Bello Adoke, SAN, CFR (2 July 2011– May 2015)
 Abubakar Malami, SAN (11 November 2015–present)

See also
Politics of Nigeria
Federal Ministries of Nigeria
Justice ministry
Nigerian Civil Service

References

External links 

Justice ministries
Federal Ministries of Nigeria